The SOSiR Stadium (pol. Stadion SOSiR) (locally known as the Lubusz Stadium (pol. Stadion Lubuski) or Polonia Stadium (pol. Stadion Polonii))  is a multi-purpose stadium in Słubice, Poland, home of the IV liga football club Polonia Słubice. It is located just east of the Oder river close to the German border.

Building work on the  complex employing Russian prisoners of war commenced in spring of 1914, when present-day Słubice was still part of German Frankfurt (Oder), but due to the effects of World War I wasn't completed until 1927. Despite its name and contrary to common belief, the Olympic Stadium (originally named Ostmarkstadion) was not built for the 1936 Summer Olympics.

With the implementation of the Oder–Neisse line, the area passed to the Republic of Poland in 1945. The stadium underwent a complete refurbishment in 2003. It now counts as one of the oldest stadia in Poland with its historical south-eastern tribune reminiscent of an amphitheatre.

References

External links 

 Słubicki Ośrodek Sportu i Rekreacji – Owners of the Lubusz Stadium 

Slubice
Stadium
Sports venues in Lubusz Voivodeship